Diego Lochness Santos Oliveira (born 11 February 1987) is a Brazilian footballer.

Biography
Oliveira started his professional career at Italian Serie A side Chievo. In July 2005, he was loaned to Padova of Serie C1.

Cittadella
He left for Serie C1 side Cittadella on 4 July 2007 on loan with option to sign him in co-ownership deal in the next season. He won promotion playoffs with club in 2008 and promoted to Serie B. He continued to play as a substitute player after the club purchased him for €500.

On 26 June 2009, Chievo bought him back for an undisclosed fee, but on 24 July 2009 returned to Cittadella in another co-ownership deal for €500. Cittadella later signed Antimo Iunco on loan and signed Oliveira outright ; it sold Manuel Iori to Chievo in co-ownership deal. Oliveira started 13 Serie B matches and also played 10 league matches as substitute.

Vicenza
On 1 July 2010, he was signed by fellow Serie B side Vicenza in 3-year contract, for €130,000 (direct swap with Julián Magallanes who tagged for €130,000).

On 27 January 2011, he mutually terminated his contract to return to Brazil.

On 9 August 2011 he accepted to play in Serie D for Venezia thanks to the insistence of the Director of Football Oreste Cinquini, who previously took Oliveira in Italy when he was only thirteen.

References

External links
 Profile at La Gazzetta dello Sport (2009–10) 
 
 Profile at Football.it 
 

Brazilian footballers
Brazilian expatriate footballers
Serie B players
Campo Grande Atlético Clube players
Bologna F.C. 1909 players
A.C. ChievoVerona players
Calcio Padova players
A.S. Cittadella players
F.C. Matera players
Expatriate footballers in Italy
Association football wingers
Sportspeople from Bahia
1987 births
Living people